Trypocopris is a genus of earth-boring dung beetles.

Species
 Trypocopris alpinus (Sturm & Hagenbach, 1825)
 Trypocopris amedei (Fairmaire, 1861)
 Trypocopris fulgidus (Motschulsky, 1845)
 Trypocopris inermis (Ménétriés, 1832)
 Trypocopris pyrenaeus (Charpentier, 1825)
 Trypocopris vernalis (Linnaeus, 1758) 
 Trypocopris zaitzevi (Olsoufieff, 1918)

Scarabaeoidea genera
Geotrupidae